Union Bridge is a town in Carroll County, Maryland, United States. The population was 936 at the 2020 census.

Much of the town was added to the National Register of Historic Places as the Union Bridge Historic District in 1994.

Geography
Union Bridge is located at  (39.568550, -77.177618).

Transportation
The primary method of travel to and from Union Bridge is by road. The only primary highway serving the town is Maryland Route 75, which follows Green Valley Road and Main Street through Union Bridge. From Union Bridge, MD 75 connects southward to Libertytown and New Market, and turns eastward to New Windsor.

Demographics

2010 census
As of the census of 2010, there were 975 people, 394 households, and 251 families living in the town. The racial makeup of the town was 91.7% White, 5.1% African American, 0.3% Native American, 0.7% from other races, and 2.2% from two or more races. Hispanic or Latino of any race were 1.4% of the population.

There were 394 households, of which 34.0% had children under the age of 18 living with them, 44.2% were married couples living together, 13.2% had a female householder with no husband present, 6.3% had a male householder with no wife present, and 36.3% were non-families. 29.7% of all households were made up of individuals, and 14.7% had someone living alone who was 65 years of age or older. The average household size was 2.47 and the average family size was 3.06.

The median age in the town was 39.2 years. 23.9% of residents were under the age of 18; 10.6% were between the ages of 18 and 24; 24.3% were from 25 to 44; 26.2% were from 45 to 64; and 15.1% were 65 years of age or older. The gender makeup of the town was 48.6% male and 51.4% female.

2000 census
As of the census of 2000, there were 989 people, 372 households, and 265 families living in the town. The racial makeup of the town was 92.82% White, 5.56% African American, 0.40% Native American, 0.10% Asian, and 1.11% from two or more races. Hispanic or Latino of any race were 0.51% of the population.

There were 372 households, out of which 36.8% had children under the age of 18 living with them, 53.0% were married couples living together, 13.2% had a female householder with no husband present, and 28.5% were non-families. 22.8% of all households were made up of individuals, and 7.8% had someone living alone who was 65 years of age or older. The average household size was 2.66 and the average family size was 3.11.

In the town, the population was spread out, with 28.9% under the age of 18, 6.3% from 18 to 24, 30.3% from 25 to 44, 21.3% from 45 to 64, and 13.1% who were 65 years of age or older. The median age was 36 years. For every 100 females, there were 96.6 males. For every 100 females age 18 and over, there were 92.1 males.

The median income for a household in the town was $36,250, and the median income for a family was $37,500. Males had a median income of $31,563 versus $20,083 for females. The per capita income for the town was $17,827. About 10.6% of families and 13.7% of the population were below the poverty line, including 21.8% of those under age 18 and 5.7% of those age 65 or over.

Notable people 
 John Hanson Farquhar, U.S. Representative for Indiana
 Bill Oakley, former co-executive producer and head writer for The Simpsons and Mission Hill
 William Henry Rinehart, noted sculptor

See also 
 Maryland Midland Railway
 Union Bridge Station, historic railway station
 List of municipalities in Maryland
 National Register of Historic Places listings in Carroll County, Maryland

References

External links

 Town of Union Bridge official website
 Stonesifer, Oliver J., 1869- History of Union Bridge, O.J. Stonesifer. Union Bridge, Md., Pilot Publishing Company, 1937.

 
Towns in Maryland
Towns in Carroll County, Maryland